Thelodontiformes is an extinct order of jawless fish of the Silurian.

Because the paucity of intact fossils, especially since some families are known entirely from scale fossils, taxonomy of thelodonts is based primarily on scale morphology. A recent assessment of thelodont taxonomy by Wilson and Märss in 2009 merges the orders Loganelliiformes, Katoporiida and Shieliiformes into Thelodontiformes, places families Lanarkiidae and Nikoliviidae into Furcacaudiformes (because of scale morphology) and establishes Archipelepidiformes as the basal-most order.

References

External links 
 

Thelodonti
Silurian jawless fish
Prehistoric jawless fish orders
Silurian first appearances
Silurian extinctions